Khalil Fong (Chinese: 方大同; born 14 July 1983) is a Hong Kong-based American singer-songwriter and producer.

The biographical film La Bamba, about the life and career of Ritchie Valens, greatly influenced Fong's decision to become a musician. Fong is a member of the Baháʼí Faith. He is a vegetarian.

Discography

Studio albums

Live albums

Compilation albums

Filmography

Television series 
 CRHK Love Park (戀愛樂園)

Film

Awards and nominations

References

External links

Official Facebook
Instagram- soulboykhalilfong 
Twitter- soulboy_kfong 
Official Sina Weibo

Hong Kong Bahá'ís
American Bahá'ís
1983 births
Living people
American people of Hong Kong descent
Singers from Hawaii
Hong Kong  male singer-songwriters
Hong Kong Mandopop singers
21st-century Bahá'ís
21st-century Hong Kong male  singers
21st-century American male singers
21st-century American singers
Mandopop musicians
American born Hong Kong artists
MAMA Award winners